Chandral is a small village situated several kilometres north east of Mirpur, Azad Kashmir. It has a population of several hundred.

History
Due to the raising of the Mangla Dam the village will be almost surrounded by water within the next few years with sea front views. The modern village is sometimes referred to as a small piece of paradise on earth. The majority of the village have emigrated to Birmingham in the United Kingdom but the village constantly gets developed and is known as 'Little England' with its breath taking views

Sites 
Major attractions include "the Bani", a small lagoon west of the village.
Google maps co-ordinates - 33.1530412, 73.7767738

References

Populated places in Mirpur District